A jambonnette is a form of charcuterie composed of approximately equal parts of chopped pork and bacon enclosed in rind, moulded into a pear shape and cooked.  It may also refer to stuffed ham or poultry leg.

See also
 Galantine
 Jambonneau

Notes

French cuisine
Bacon dishes
Pork dishes